Mohamed Hichem Mezaïr (born October 16, 1976 in Tlemcen) is an Algerian former footballer.

Career
Mezaïr was a member of the Algerian 2004 African Nations Cup team, which finished second in its group in the first round of competition before being defeated by Morocco in the quarter-finals.

According to Lebuteur.com, Mezaïr received a two-year football ban, effective April 12, 2010.

National team statistics

References

External links

1976 births
2004 African Cup of Nations players
Algeria international footballers
Algerian footballers
Algerian Ligue 2 players
CR Belouizdad players
Living people
MC Oran players
People from Tlemcen
USM Alger players
USM Annaba players
WA Tlemcen players
Algeria under-23 international footballers
Algeria youth international footballers
RC Relizane players
Association football goalkeepers
Competitors at the 1997 Mediterranean Games
Mediterranean Games competitors for Algeria
21st-century Algerian people